Artsyom Kaminsky (born 1 March 1994) is a Belarusian former professional footballer who is currently playing for Osipovichi.

Career
His first professional club was Belshina Bobruisk.

References

External links

Profile at Pressball

1994 births
Living people
Belarusian footballers
FC Belshina Bobruisk players
FC Khimik Svetlogorsk players
FC Osipovichi players
Association football midfielders
People from Babruysk
Sportspeople from Mogilev Region